North Waghi Rural LLG is a local-level government (LLG) of Jiwaka Province, Papua New Guinea.

Wards
01. Kimil 1
02. Kimil 2
03. Bung 1
04. Koskala 2
05. Koskala 1
06. Kakinjep
07. Molka 1
09. Kwiena 1
10. Kwiena 2
11. Dumbola 1
12. Talu 1
13. Kendu 1
14. Bolimba 1
15. Bung 2
16. Bung 3
17. Koskala 3
18. Kakinjep 2
19. Molka 2
20. Dumbola 2
21. Talu 2
22. Kendu 2
23. Bolimba 2
24. Kakinjep 3
80. Banz Town

References

Local-level governments of Jiwaka Province